Kıratlı  is a village in Dikili district of İzmir Province, Turkey.  It is one of the northernmost villages of the district. It is situated to the east of Turkish state highway  and Aegean Sea coast.  The population of the village is 724  as of 2011.

References

Villages in Dikili District